Värriöjoki is a tributary river of Kemijoki in Savukoski and Salla in Lapland. The river originates in the Tuntsa Wilderness Area in Salla and joins the River Kemijoki in Martuk Savukoski.

References

Rivers of Finland
Kemijoki basin
Rivers of Salla